The Color of Lies (French: Au cœur du mensonge) is a 1999 psychological mystery film co-written and directed by Claude Chabrol. The film was entered into the 49th Berlin International Film Festival.

Plot 
In a small town in Brittany, a 10-year-old girl is found murdered. The last person known to see her alive was her art teacher and professional artist, René (Gamblin). He becomes the primary suspect in the investigation by the new chief of police , Frédérique Lesage (Bruni-Tedeschi). The investigation destroys his life as the townspeople believe that he is the killer, despite the lack of hard evidence. René is dedicated to his wife (Bonnaire), a nurse whose perpetual happy mood is the polar opposite of his dour personality. Meanwhile, Frederique becomes better acquainted with the eccentric residents of the town, including an arrogant television journalist, (de Caunes), a small-time crook who fences stolen goods (Marlot), and a bizarre pair of married shopkeepers (Ogier and Simsolo).

Principal cast

Critical reception
The film received favorable reviews.

Variety:

“A delicious sense of suspense haunts Claude Chabrol's latest character-study-cum-whodunit... which ranks just behind the excellent “La ceremonie” among the veteran helmer’s work this decade."

Michael Thomson of BBC Films:

Michael Atkinson of The Village Voice:

Christopher Null of Filmcritic.com gave the film a good review but had only one issue of contention:

References

External links 

1999 films
1990s mystery thriller films
1990s psychological thriller films
Films directed by Claude Chabrol
Films set in France
Films shot in France
French thriller drama films
French psychological thriller films
1990s French-language films
French mystery thriller films
1990s French films